Lake Durant is a lake located 3 miles east of Blue Mountain Lake, New York. It has an area of 289 acres and an elevation of 1769 feet. Fish species present in the lake are largemouth bass, smallmouth bass, tiger muskie, black bullhead, yellow perch, and pumpkinseed sunfish. There is a state owned hard surface ramp on NY-28/NY-30, 3 miles east of Blue Mountain Lake in the campground. There is a day use fee.

References

Lakes of New York (state)
Lakes of Hamilton County, New York